Notable people who served as members with the Volunteers in Service to America program include the following:

Alurista, poet and activist
Paul H. Anderson, Minnesota Supreme Court justice; attorney for VISTA
James R. Benn
Howard Berman
Rhonda Berry
David Blankenhorn
Peter C. Brinckerhoff
Carl Gershman (1965–1967; Pittsburgh, Pennsylvania), President of the National Endowment for Democracy since 1984
Larry Gossett
Eula Hall
Richard P. (Dick) Haugland
Michael Hennessy, San Francisco sheriff
Charniele Herring, member of the Virginia House of Delegates
Patricia D. Jehlen, Massachusetts state senator
Margo Jennings, running coach
Colbert I. King
Douglas Kirby
Tom Kolwiecki, fictional character in Denise Giardina's novel The Unquiet Earth
Gerry Larson
Susan Lish
Ki Longfellow, author; VISTA volunteer on the Blackfeet Indian reservation
James H. Maloney
George R. R. Martin
John Medinger, Wisconsin State Assembly and Mayor of La Crosse, Wisconsin
Alan Meisner 
Charles E. F. Millard
Gwen Moore
Mary Murphy
Hill Pickus
James H. Rathlesberger 
Irwin Redlener
Emilie Richards
Eugene Richards
Jay Rockefeller, U.S. Senator
Tweed Roosevelt
John Singer (Faygele Ben-Miriam) (mid 1960s, St. Louis), U.S. LGBT rights activist 
Ted Smith
James Sokolove
Peterson Zah

References

Volunteers in Service to America
VISTA